The Republican Party of Ukraine is a political party in Ukraine registered in March 2005. At the legislative elections of 26 March 2006, the party was part of the Opposition Bloc "Ne Tak". The party did not participate in the 2007 election.

References

External links
 Republican Party of Ukraine official site

Political parties in Ukraine